Nargis Rasheed is a Pakistani actress who predominantly work in Urdu television serials and films. Her appearances include Mere Harjai, Bad Gumaan, Ullu Baraye Farokht Nahi, Talkhiyaan, Muhabbat Ab Nahi Hugi, Aik Pal, 
Jhoot, Akbari Asghari, Alif Allah Aur Insaan, Tajdeed e Wafa, Kiran, Jo Tu Chahey and Ready Steady No.

Filmography

Film 
Ready Steady No (2019)

Television

References

External links

Living people
Pakistani film actresses
Pakistani television actresses
21st-century Pakistani actresses
1967 births